Jim Cowell may refer to:

 Jim Cowell (ice hockey) (born 1953), Canadian ice hockey player
 Jim Cowell (Australian footballer) (1885–1956), Australian rules footballer
 Jim Cowell (Scottish footballer) (born 1961), Scottish footballer